Bech-Bruun is a Danish law firm with offices in Copenhagen, Aarhus and Shanghai. As of 2013, the firm, has 74 partners and some 400 employees. It is described as one of the "Big Four" in the Danish market for legal services.

History
Bech-Bruun traces its history back to 1872 when it was established as "Bech-Bruun I/S" but in 2001, after numerous mergers, it changed its name to "Bech-Bruun Dragsted Advokatfirma I/S", finally becoming "Bech-Bruun" in 2005. In 2011, the partnership opened an office in Shanghai to provide legal assistance to Danish firms entering the Chinese market.

In 2012, the company merged with Philip Advokatfirma, cementing its position as Denmark's second-largest law firm. The firm deals mainly with business clients.

After having won a public tender in February 2017, Bech-Bruun submitted a study report  in the so-called dividend tax case, concerning false claims for Danish dividend withholding tax refunds, which is believed to have cost the Danish state 12.7 billion DKK. In November 2018, in the context of a police investigation, it was revealed that two of Bech-Bruun’s partners in 2014-2015 had advised one of the largest culprits in the dividend tax case, the North Channel Bank.

Location
Bech-Bruun has its head office at Langelinie in Copenhagen. The Aarhus office is located at Vor Frue Kirkeplads but will move into a new highrise in 2014. The Shanghai office opened in 2011.

Assessment
In the Legal 500 listing, Bech-Bruun is rated as a first tier firm in Denmark in the areas of employment, energy, environment, information technology, insolvency, media and entertainment, mergers and acquisitions, real estate and construction, shipping and transport, and telecommunications. The IFLR1000 listing of the world's leading financial law firms rates Bech-Bruun Tier 1 for restructuring and insolvency and Tier 2 for banking and finance, and mergers and acquisitions.

References

External links
 Official website

Law firms of Denmark
Law firms established in 2001
Service companies based in Copenhagen
Companies based in Copenhagen Municipality